Tony Munyonga (born 31 January 1999) is a Zimbabwean cricketer. He made his first-class debut for Rising Stars in the 2017–18 Logan Cup on 12 November 2017.

He made his List A debut for Rising Stars in the 2017–18 Pro50 Championship on 17 April 2018. The Rising Stars won the tournament, and Munyonga was named the player of the series. He made his Twenty20 debut for Mashonaland Eagles in the 2018–19 Stanbic Bank 20 Series on 17 March 2019.

In April 2019, he was named in Zimbabwe's One Day International (ODI) squad for their series against the United Arab Emirates, but he did not play. In September 2019, he was named in Zimbabwe's Twenty20 International (T20I) squad for the 2019–20 Bangladesh Tri-Nation Series. He made his T20I debut for Zimbabwe, against Bangladesh, on 13 September 2019.

In December 2020, he was selected to play for the Mountaineers in the 2020–21 Logan Cup. In August 2022, he was named in Zimbabwe's ODI squad, for their series against Bangladesh. He made his ODI debut on 7 August 2022, for Zimbabwe against Bangladesh.

References

External links
 

1999 births
Living people
Zimbabwean cricketers
Zimbabwe Twenty20 International cricketers
Zimbabwe One Day International cricketers
Mashonaland Eagles cricketers
Rising Stars cricketers
Place of birth missing (living people)